Vijay Mohanraj (born 9 September 1955) is an Indian former first-class cricketer who played for Bombay and Hyderabad. After his playing career, he became a coach and selector for Hyderabad.

Life and career
Born on 9 September 1955 in Bombay, Mohanraj was a prolific left-handed top-order batsman for Bombay, Hyderabad and South Zone. He appeared in 54 first-class matches and one List A game in a career that spanned between 1975/76 and 1987/88. He was a member of the Bombay team that won the 1976–77 Ranji Trophy and the Hyderabad team that won the 1986–87 Ranji Trophy. He scored his personal best 211 not out in the 1986–87 Ranji final against Delhi and was the fourth-highest run-scorer of the tournament with 751 runs averaging 75.10.

After retirement, Mohanraj became a coach and a selector for Hyderabad Cricket Association (HCA). A qualified cricket coach for the National Cricket Academy, he worked as a manager for the Deccan Chargers during the 2008 Indian Premier League. He is also the secretary of the Veterans Cricket Association of HCA.

Mohanraj is the managing director of Uniglobe Sameera Travels, an associate of Uniglobe Travels.

References

External links 
 
 

1955 births
Living people
Indian cricketers
Mumbai cricketers
Hyderabad cricketers
South Zone cricketers
Indian cricket coaches